Lyons Peak is a prominent mountain located in San Diego County. The top of the mountain is enclosed in an almost rectangular patch of the Cleveland National Forest. An old fire lookout is located on the top.

This peak is located on restricted land and trespassing is strongly prohibited.

The peak's toponym honors Nathaniel Lyon (1818–1861). As an army captain, he passed by this peak in 1851 while scouting a new route east to the desert.

References

Mountains of San Diego County, California
Mountains of Southern California